Allobates bromelicola (common name: coastal rocket frog) is a species of frog in the family Aromobatidae. It is endemic to the Venezuelan Coastal Range in the Aragua state.
Its natural habitat is cloud forest, where it breeds inside bromeliads.

References

bromelicola
Amphibians of Venezuela
Endemic fauna of Venezuela
Taxonomy articles created by Polbot
Amphibians described in 1956